Gobe may refer to:
 Gobè, an arrondissement in Zou, Benin
 Gobe, Corisco, the largest settlement on Corisco, Equatorial Guinea
 "Gobe" (song), a 2013 single by Nigerian singer Davido
 Gobe Software (1997–2010), a software company
 Great Ordovician Biodiversification Event, an evolutionary radiation of animal life throughout the Ordovician period
Glenda Gobe, Australian molecular biologist